Learning to Swim is a book written by Sara J. Henry and published by Crown Publishing Group (now owned by Penguin Random House) on 22 February 2011 which later went on to win the Mary Higgins Clark Award in 2012.

References 

American mystery novels
2011 American novels
Crown Publishing Group books